Distichodus petersii is a species of fish in the family Distichodontidae. It is endemic to Tanzania.  Its natural habitat is rivers.

The fish patronym was not identified in the original description but was probably in honor of Wilhelm C. H. Peters (1815-1883), a German naturalist and explorer whose travels to Africa brought to Berlin a huge collection of natural history specimens, including many fishes which Peters described.

References

Distichodus
Freshwater fish of Tanzania
Endemic fauna of Tanzania
Taxa named by Georg Johann Pfeffer
Fish described in 1896
Taxonomy articles created by Polbot